Eugene Sobchuk (born February 19, 1951) was a Canadian former professional ice hockey player. He played one game in the National Hockey League, with the Vancouver Canucks on December 4, 1973. He would play 81 games in the World Hockey Association with the Phoenix Roadrunners and Cincinnati Stingers. Throughout his career, which lasted from 1971 to 1978, Sobchuk also played in various minor leagues as well. Gene is the brother of Dennis Sobchuk.

Career statistics

Regular season and playoffs

See also
List of players who played only one game in the NHL

External links 

1951 births
Living people
Canadian expatriate ice hockey players in the United States
Canadian ice hockey left wingers
Cincinnati Stingers players
Des Moines Oak Leafs players
Hampton Gulls (AHL) players
Ice hockey people from Saskatchewan
New York Rangers draft picks
Phoenix Roadrunners (WHA) players
Regina Pats players
Rochester Americans players
Seattle Totems (WHL) players
Springfield Indians players
Tulsa Oilers (1964–1984) players
Vancouver Canucks players
Weyburn Red Wings players